Dani Isaacsohn is an American politician and businessman who is a member-elect of the Ohio House of Representatives for the 24th district. Elected in November 2022, he assumed office on January 1, 2023.

Early life and education 
A native of Cincinnati, Isaacsohn graduated from Walnut Hills High School in 2007. He earned a Bachelor of Science degree in foreign relations from the Walsh School of Foreign Service, Juris Doctor from Yale University, and Master of Philosophy in politics from the University of Cambridge.

Career 
Isaacsohn began his career as a field organizer for the Barack Obama 2008 presidential campaign. In 2014, he worked as a legal intern in the Office of White House Counsel. In 2013 and 2014, he worked as the deputy campaigns and political director of Battleground Texas. He was also a summer associate at Debevoise & Plimpton. In 2016, Isaacsohn was the deputy get-out-the-vote director of the Democratic Party of Virginia and Hillary Clinton 2016 presidential campaign. From 2017 to 2019, he was a senior advisor at 17a, a public service strategy organization based in Cincinnati. In 2017, he founded Cohear, a consulting firm.

References 

Living people
People from Cincinnati
Politicians from Cincinnati
Democratic Party members of the Ohio House of Representatives
Georgetown University alumni
Walsh School of Foreign Service alumni
Yale Law School alumni
Alumni of the University of Cambridge
Obama administration personnel
Year of birth missing (living people)